Phyllonorycter haasi is a moth of the family Gracillariidae. It is known from France, Portugal and Spain. The larvae feed on Cytisus balansae.

References

haasi
Moths of Europe
Moths described in 1901